The Squire's Crystal is a novel by Jacqueline Rayner, featuring Bernice Summerfield, a character from the spin-off media based on the long-running British science fiction television series Doctor Who.

External links
Big Finish Productions - Bernice Summerfield: The Squire's Crystal

2001 British novels
Bernice Summerfield novels
British science fiction novels
Novels by Jacqueline Rayner